Bromantane, sold under the brand name Ladasten, is an atypical psychostimulant and anxiolytic drug of the adamantane family related to amantadine and memantine which is used in Russia in the treatment of neurasthenia. Although the effects of the bromantane have been determined to be dependent on the dopaminergic and possibly serotonergic neurotransmitter systems, its exact mechanism of action is unknown, and it is distinct in its properties relative to typical psychostimulants such as amphetamine. Because of its unique aspects, bromantane has sometimes been described instead as an adaptogen and actoprotector.

Medical uses

Clinical research
The therapeutic effects of bromantane in asthenia are said to onset within 1- to 3-days. It has been proposed that the combination of psychostimulant and anxiolytic activity may give bromantane special efficacy in the treatment of asthenia.

In a large-scale, multi-center clinical trial of 728 patients diagnosed with asthenia, bromantane was given for 28 days at a daily dose of 50 mg or 100 mg. The impressiveness were 76.0% on the CGI-S and 90.8% on the CGI-I, indicating broadly-applicable, high effectiveness. The therapeutic benefit against asthenia was notably observed to still be present one-month after discontinuation of the drug, indicating long-lasting positive effects of bromantane. Quality of life was significantly increased by bromantane, and this increase remained at one-month after withdrawal of bromantane. 3% of patients experienced side effects; none of the adverse effects were serious; and 0.8% of patients discontinued treatment due to side effects. Bromantane was also noted to normalize the sleep-wake cycle. The authors concluded that "[Bromantane] in daily dose from 50 to 100 mg is a highly effective, well-tolerated and [safe] drug with a wide spectrum of clinical effects. Therefore, this drug could be recommended for treatment of asthenic disorders in neurological practice."

Effects 
Bromantane is described primarily as a mild psychostimulant and anxiolytic. It is also said to possess antiasthenic properties. Bromantane is reported to improve physical and mental performance, and hence could be considered a performance-enhancing drug.

Bromantane has been found to lower the levels of pro-inflammatory cytokines IL-6, IL-17 and IL-4 and to normalize behavior in animal models of depression, and may possess clinical efficacy as an antidepressant. It has also been found to increase sexual receptivity and proceptivity in rats of both sexes, which was attributed to its dopaminergic actions. It has been proposed that bromantane may suppress prolactin levels by virtue of its dopaminergic properties as well. Bromantane has been found to "agonize" amphetamine-induced stereotypies in vivo, suggesting that it might potentiate certain effects of other psychostimulants.

The psychostimulant effects of bromantane onset gradually within 1.5- to 2-hours and last for 8- to 12-hours.

Pharmacology

Pharmacodynamics

Dopamine synthesis enhancement
Although it is frequently labeled as a psychostimulant, bromantane is distinct in its pharmacology and effects relative to typical psychostimulants, such as the phenethylamines (e.g., amphetamine and its derivatives) and their structural analogues (e.g., methylphenidate, cocaine, mesocarb, etc.). Whereas the latter directly act on the dopamine transporter to inhibit the reuptake and/or induce the release of dopamine, bromantane instead acts via indirect genomic mechanisms to produce a rapid, pronounced, and long-lasting upregulation in a variety of brain regions of the expression of tyrosine hydroxylase (TH) and aromatic L-amino acid decarboxylase (AAAD) (also known as DOPA decarboxylase), key enzymes in the dopamine biosynthesis pathway. For instance, a single dose of bromantane produces a 2- to 2.5-fold increase in TH expression in the rat hypothalamus 1.5- to 2-hours post-administration. The biosynthesis and release of dopamine subsequently increase in close correlation with TH and AAAD upregulation. Enhancement of dopaminergic neurotransmission is observed in the hypothalamus, striatum, ventral tegmental area, nucleus accumbens, and other regions. As such, the key mechanism of the pharmacological activity and psychostimulant effects of bromantane is activation of the de novo synthesis of dopamine via modulation of gene expression. 

A selection of quoted excerpts from the medical literature detail the differences between bromantane and typical psychostimulants:

 "Bromantane [does] not concede well-known psychostimulant of phenylalkylamine structure and its analogs (amphetamine, [mesocarb], [methylphenidate], etc.) by specific activity. In contrast, bromantane has neither addictive potential nor reveals redundant and exhausting activation of sympaticoadrenergic system, or decelerates the restoring of work capacity at preventive application before forthcoming activity in complicated conditions (hypoxia, high environmental temperature, physical overfatigue, emotional stress, etc.). Bromantane has no prohypoxic activity."
 "The use of the drug, in contrast to the action of a typical psychostimulant, is not associated with the phenomenon of hyperstimulation and causes no consequences such as functional exhaustion of the body."
 "Bromantane administration in therapeutic doses is characterized by the almost full absence of side effects including manifestations of withdrawal syndrome and hyperstimulation."
 "[Bromantane] has low peripheral sympathomimetic effects. Moreover, no signs of [bromantane] dependence and withdrawal symptoms were found."

Bromantane is well tolerated and elicits few side effects (including peripheral sympathomimetic effects and hyperstimulation), does not appear to produce tolerance or dependence, has not been associated with withdrawal symptoms upon discontinuation, and displays an absence of addiction potential, contrary to typical psychostimulants. In accordance with human findings, animals exposed to bromantane for extended periods of time do not appear to develop tolerance or dependence.

The precise direct molecular mechanism of action by which bromantane ultimately acts as a dopamine synthesis enhancer is unknown. However, it has been determined that activation of certain cAMP-, Ca2+-, and phospholipid-dependent protein kinases such as protein kinase A and especially protein kinase C corresponds with the manifestation of the pharmacological effects of bromantane. Bromantane may activate intracellular signaling cascades by some mechanism (e.g., agonizing some as-yet-undetermined receptor) to in turn activate protein kinases, which in turn cause increased transcription of TH and AAAD.

Researchers discovered that amantadine and memantine bind to and act as agonists of the σ1 receptor (Ki = 7.44 μM and 2.60 μM, respectively) and that activation of the σ1 receptor is involved in the central dopaminergic effects of amantadine at therapeutically relevant concentrations; the authors of the study stated that this could also be the mechanism of action of bromantane, as it is in the same family of structurally related compounds and evidence suggests a role of dopamine in its effects. But this could also be seen as evidence of the contrary since bromantane has effects that are distinctly different from amantadine and memantine.

Monoamine reuptake inhibition
Bromantane was once thought to act as a reuptake inhibitor of serotonin and dopamine. While bromantane can inhibit the reuptake of serotonin, dopamine, and to a lesser extent norepinephrine in vitro in rat brain tissue, the concentrations required to do so are extremely high (50–500 μM) and likely not clinically relevant. Although one study found an IC50 for dopamine transport of 3.56 μM, relative to 28.66 nM for mesocarb; neither drug affected serotonin transport at the tested concentrations, in contrast. The lack of typical psychostimulant-like effects and adverse effects seen with bromantane may help corroborate the notion that it is not acting significantly as a monoamine reuptake inhibitor, but rather via enhancement of dopamine synthesis.

Other actions
Bromantane has been found to increase the expression of neurotrophins including brain-derived neurotrophic factor and nerve growth factor in certain rat brain areas.

Although not relevant at clinical dosages, bromantane has been found to produce anticholinergic effects, including both antimuscarinic and antinicotinic actions, at very high doses in animals, and these effects are responsible for its toxicity (that is, LD50) in animals.

Pharmacokinetics
Bromantane is used clinically in doses of 50 mg to 100 mg per day in the treatment of asthenia.

The main metabolite of bromantane is 6β-hydroxybromantane.

Chemistry
Bromantane is an adamantane derivative. It is also known as adamantylbromphenylamine, from which its name was derived.

History

In the 1960s, the adamantane derivative amantadine (1-aminoadamantane) was developed as an antiviral drug for the treatment of influenza. Other adamantane antivirals subsequently followed, such as rimantadine (1-(1-aminoethyl)adamantane) and adapromine (1-(1-aminopropyl)adamantane). It was serendipitously discovered in 1969 that amantadine possesses central dopaminergic psychostimulant-like properties, and subsequent investigation revealed that rimantadine and adapromine also possess such properties. Amantadine was then developed and introduced for the treatment of Parkinson's disease due to its ability to increase dopamine levels in the brain. It has also notably since been used to help alleviate fatigue in multiple sclerosis.

With the knowledge of the dopaminergic psychostimulant effects of the adamantane derivatives, bromantane, which is 2-(4-bromophenylamino)adamantane, was developed in the 1980s at the Zakusov State Institute of Pharmacology, USSR Academy of Medical Sciences (now the Russian Academy of Medical Sciences) in Moscow as "a drug having psychoactivating and adaptogen properties under complicated conditions (hypoxia, high environmental temperature, physical overfatigue, emotional stress, etc.)". It was found to produce more marked and prolonged psychostimulant effects than the other adamantanes, and eventually entered use. The drug was notably given to soldiers in the Soviet and Russian militaries to "shorten recovery times after strong physical exertion". After the break-up of the Soviet Union in 1991, bromantane continued to be researched and characterized but was mainly limited in use to sports medicine (for instance, to enhance athletic performance). In 1996, it was encountered as a doping agent in the 1996 Summer Olympics when several Russian athletes tested positive for it, and was subsequently placed on the World Anti-Doping Agency banned list in 1997 as a stimulant and masking agent.

Bromantane was eventually repurposed in 2005 as a treatment for neurasthenia. It demonstrated effectiveness and safety for the treatment of the condition in extensive, including large-scale clinical trials, and was approved for this indication in Russia under the brand name Ladasten sometime around 2009.

Synthesis

The reductive amination between 2-Adamantanone [700-58-3] and 4-Bromoaniline [106-40-1] in the presence of formic acid gave bromantane (3).

References

External links

Adamantanes
Anilines
Antidepressants
Anxiolytics
Aphrodisiacs
Bromoarenes
Dopamine reuptake inhibitors
Drugs in the Soviet Union
Drugs with unknown mechanisms of action
Nootropics
Russian drugs
Russian inventions
Stimulants
World Anti-Doping Agency prohibited substances